The Ned Kelly Awards (named for bushranger Ned Kelly) are Australia's leading literary awards for crime writing in both the crime fiction and true crime genres. They were established in 1996 by the Crime Writers Association of Australia to reward excellence in the field of crime writing within Australia.

The genre of crime writing has long been popular, but it was not until the early 1990s that a local growth of writing within the genre occurred in Australia. By the middle of the decade support for the field had grown sufficiently that it was decided to establish the Ned Kelly Awards.

The awards are affectionately referred to as 'The Neddies' within the community.

Categories
Best First Novel
Best True Crime
Best Novel
Best Teenage/Young Adult
Readers Vote
Best Non-Fiction
Lifetime Achievement Awards

Winners

Shortlists

2021

Best Crime Novel

 Garry Disher, Consolation
 Candice Fox, Gathering Dark
 Sulari Gentill, A Testament of Character
 Jane Harper, The Survivors
 Dervla McTiernan, The Good Turn
 J P Pomare, Tell Me Lies
 Michael Robotham, When She Was Good
 Sarah Thornton, White Throat

Best Debut Crime Novel

 Rae Cairns, The Good Mother
 Lorraine Peck, The Second Son
 Kyle Perry, The Bluffs
 Greg Woodlands, The Night Whistler

Best true crime

 Tanya Bretherton, The Husband Poisoner
 Bret Christian, Stalking Claremont: Inside the hunt for a serial killer
 Mark Dapin, Public Enemies
 Tom Doig, Hazelwood
 Louise Milligan, Witness

Best international crime fiction

 Lucy Foley, The Guest List
 Charity Norman, The Secrets of Strangers
 Sara Sligar, Take Me Apart
 Chris Whittaker, We Begin at the End
 Don Winslow, Broken

2020

Best Crime Novel

 Nick Gadd, Death of a Typographer
 Dave Warner, River of Salt
 Dervla McTiernan, The Scholar
 Pip Drysdale, The Strangers We Know
 David Whish-Wilson, True West
 Christian White, The Wife and the Widow

Best First Crime Novel

 Susan Hurley, Eight Lives
 Sarah Thornton, Lapse
 R W R McDonald, The Nancys
 Natalie Conyer, Present Tense
 Petronella McGovern, Six Minutes
 Karina Kilmore, Where the Truth Lies

Best True Crime

 Dan Box, Bowraville
 Kate McClymont, Dead Man Walking: The murky world of Michael McGurk and Ron Medich
 Phillip Roope and Kevin Meagher, Shark Arm
 Angela Williams, Snakes and Ladders

2019

Best Crime Novel
 Garry Disher, Kill Shot: A Wyatt Thriller
 Candice Fox, Gone by Midnight
 Kerry Greenwood, The Spotted Dog
 Jane Harper, The Lost Man
 Michael Robotham, The Other Wife
 Sue Williams, Live and Let Fry

Best First Crime Novel
 Katherine Kovacic, The Portrait of Molly Dean
 Dervla McTiernan, The Ruin
 Emily O'Grady, The Yellow House
 Ben Stevenson, Greenlight

Best True Crime
 Chloe Hooper, The Arsonist
 Bri Lee, Eggshell Skull
 Deborah Snow, Siege: Inside the Lindt Cafe
 Kate Wild, Waiting for Elijah

2018

Best Crime Novel
 Alan Carter, Marlborough Man
 Garry Disher, Under Cold Bright Lights
 Candice Fox, Redemption Point
 Sulari Gentill, Crossing the Lines
 Anna George, The Lone Child
 Iain Ryan, The Student

Best First Crime Novel
 Mark Brandi, Wimmera
 Sarah Bailey, The Dark Lake
 Megan Goldin, The Girl in Keller’s Way
 Sarah Schmidt, See What I Have Done

Best True Crime
 Mark Abernethy, The Contractor
 Graham Archer, Unmaking A Murder: The Mysterious Death of Anna Jane Cheney
 Tanya Bretherton, The Suitcase Baby
 Campbell McConachie, The Fatalist
 Gabriella Coslovich, Whiteley on Trial

2017

Best Crime Novel
 Emily Maguire, An Isolated Incident
 Candice Fox, Crimson Lake
 Ann Turner, Out of the Ice
 Adrian McKinty, Police at the Station and They Don't Look Friendly
 Wendy James, The Golden Child
 Jock Serong, The Rules of Backyard Cricket

Best First Crime Novel
 Ron Elliott, Burn Patterns
 Holly Throsby, Goodwood
 Anna Snoekstra, Only Daughter
 Andy Muir, Something for Nothing
 Jane Harper, The Dry
 Laura Elizabeth Woollett, The Love of a Bad Man

Best True Crime
 Colin Dillon, with Tom Gilling, Code of Silence
 Terry Smyth, Denny Day
 Duncan McNab, Getting Away with Murder
 Mark Tedeschi, Murder at Myall Creek
 Duncan McNab, Roger Rogerson
 Brendan James Murray, The Drowned Man

2016
Best Crime Novel
 Mark Dapin, R&R
 Garry Disher, The Heat
 Candice Fox, Fall
 Adrian McKinty, Rain Dogs
 Barry Maitland, Ash Island
 Dave Warner, Before It Breaks

Best First Crime Novel
 Tania Chandler, Please Don't Leave Me Here
 J. M. Green, Good Money
 Mark Hollands, Amplify
 Gary Kemble, Skin Deep
 Iain Ryan, Four Days
Emma Viskic, Resurrection Bay

Best True Crime
 Gideon Haigh, Certain Admissions
 Kate Kyriacou, The Sting
 Martin Mckenzie-Murray, A Murder Without Motive
 Rebecca Poulson, Killing love
 Mark Tedeschi, Kidnapped

2015
Best Crime Novel
 Peter Docker, Sweet One
 Candice Fox, Eden
 Sulari Gentill, A Murder Unmentioned
 Barry Maitland, Crucifixion Creek
 Adrian McKinty, Gun Street Girl
 Malla Nunn, Present Darkness

Best First Crime Novel
 Nigel Bartlett, King of the Road
 Anna George, What Came Before
 Nicholas J Johnson, Chasing the Ace
 Jock Serong, Quota

Best True Crime
 Amy Dale, The Fall
 Helen Garner, This House of Grief: The Story of a Murder Trial
 Debi Marshall, The Family Court Murders
 Kate McClymont and Linton Besser, He Who Must Be Obeid
 David Murray, The Murder of Allison Baden-Clay
 Liam Pieper, The Feel-Good Hit of the Year

2014
Best Crime Novel
 Garry Disher, Bitter Wash Road
 Kathryn Fox, Fatal Impact
 Adrian McKinty, In The Morning I'll Be Gone
 PM Newton, Beams Falling
 Stephen Orr, One Boy Missing
 Angela Savage, The Dying Beach

Best First Crime Novel
 Peter Cotton, Dead Cat Bounce
 Candice Fox, Hades
 Alex Hammond, Blood Witness
 Ellie Marney, Every Breath

Best True Crime
 Paul Dale, Disgraced?
 John Kidman & Denise Hofman, Forever Nine
 Eleanor Learmonth & Jenny Tabakoff, No Mercy
 Colin McLaren, JFK: The Smoking Gun
 Duncan McNab, Outlaw Bikers in Australia
 John Safran, Murder in Mississippi

2013
Best Crime Novel
 Robert Gott, The Holiday Murders
 Katherine Howell, Web of Deceit
 Geoffrey McGeachin, Blackwattle Creek
 Adrian McKinty, I Hear The Sirens In The Street
 Malla Nunn, Silent Valley

Best First Crime Novel
 Paul Anderson, The Robbers
 Andrew Grimes, The Richmond Conspiracy
 Steve Lewis & Chris Uhlmann, The Marmalade Files
 Zane Lovitt, The Midnight Promise
 Sue Williams, Murder With The Lot

Best True Crime
 Robin de Crespigny, The People Smuggler
 Belinda Hawkins, Every Parent's Nightmare
 Steve Lillebuen, The Devil's Cinema
 Derek Pedley, Dead by Friday
 Mark Tedeschi QC, Eugenia

2012
Best Crime Novel
 J. C. Burke, Pig Boy
 Malcolm Knox, The Life
 Barry Maitland, Chelsea Mansions

Best First Crime Novel
 Claire Corbett, When We Have Wings
 Peter Twohig, The Cartographer
 Kim Westwood, The Courier's New Bicycle

Best True Crime
 Eamonn Duff, Sins of the Father
 Michael Duffy, Call Me Cruel
 Liz Porter, Cold Case File

2011
Best Crime Novel
 Angela Savage, The Half-Child
 Geoffrey McGeachin, The Diggers Rest Hotel
 Chris Womersley, Bereft 

Best First Crime Novel
 Alan Carter, Prime Cut
 David Whish-Wilson, Line of Sight
 P.M. Newton, The Old School

Best True Crime
 Geesche Jacobson, Abandoned: The Sad Death of Dianne Brimble
 Ross Honeywill, Wasted
 Lindsay Simpson & Jennifer Cooke, Honeymoon Dive

2010
Best Crime Novel
 Lenny Bartulin, The Black Russian
 Michael Robotham, Bleed For Me
 Garry Disher, Wyatt

Best First Crime Novel
 Andrew Coome, Document Z
 Mark Dapin, King of the Cross
 Robin Adair, Death and the Running Patterer

Best True Crime
 Peter Doyle, Crooks like Us
 Kathy Marks, Pitcairn: Paradise Lost
 Robert M. Kaplan, Medical Murder: Disturbing Cases of Doctors Who Kill

See also
 List of Australian literary awards

References

External links 

Holders of the Ned Kelly Awards

Australian literary awards
Awards established in 1996
 
 
Mystery and detective fiction awards
1996 establishments in Australia